Pseudolmedia is a flowering plant genus in the mulberry family (Moraceae). Species are found in southern Mexico, the Caribbean, and Meso- and South America. They are known in Latin America as lechechiva (approximately "goat's milk tree") and used for timber, construction wood, and sometimes in folk medicine.

Selected species
 Pseudolmedia ferruginea (Poepp. & Endl.) Trécul (type) *
 Pseudolmedia gentryi C.C.Berg
 Pseudolmedia glabrata (Liebm.) C.C.Berg, called cherry
 Pseudolmedia havanensis Trécul (type) *
 Pseudolmedia hirtula Kuhlm.
 Pseudolmedia laevigata Trécul
 Pseudolmedia laevis (Ruiz & Pav.) J.F.Macbr.
 Pseudolmedia macrophylla Trécul
 Pseudolmedia manabiensis C.C.Berg
 Pseudolmedia mollis Standl.
 Pseudolmedia rigida (Klotzsch & H.Karst.) Cuatrec.
 Pseudolmedia spuria (Sw.) Griseb.
 List sources :
* Note: Despite having been designated as types for this genus, The Plant List considers P. ferruginea to be a synonym of P. laevis; and P. havanensis to be a synonym of P. spuria.

References

 
Taxonomy articles created by Polbot
Moraceae genera